Buffalypso, also called Trinidadian Buffalo, is a breed of Riverine water buffalo (Bubalus bubalis) developed in Trinidad by veterinarian Stephen Bennett (1922–2011) in the early 1960s.

History
In 1948, after completing his veterinary studies at the Ontario Veterinary College (University of Guelph), Bennett returned to his native Trinidad to work, among other places, on the estates of Caroni Limited Sugar Company. There, he recognized the potential of water buffaloes whose draft power had been used in sugarcane cultivation.  Using selective breeding methods on some of the hardiest animals of the Jafarabadi and Bhadawari breeds, he created a breed that could serve both milk and meat production, while presenting increased resistance to infection with tuberculosis (Mycobacterium bovis) compared to their forbears. The name "Buffalypso" was chosen as a combination of "buffalo" with the style of music, calypso that originated in Trinidad and Tobago. 

Indian water buffaloes were imported to Trinidad from India, from the early 20th–century through 1949. In addition to draft power, the animals provided dairy products, such as ghee, that were appreciated by workers with East Indian backgrounds. Feed for the buffaloes, with their good ability to digest fibrous plant materials, was economically supplied by refuse cane from sugar production.

By the early 2000s, the promise of the hardy, dual-purpose buffalo breed developed by Bennett was dwindling. In 2018, a conference at University of the West Indies took up the question of how it could be rehabilitated, amidst state neglect of disease testing and diminished vigilance over breeding.  Whatever comes of these efforts, the Buffalypso have established posterity elsewhere in the Western hemisphere, having been exported to South American countries such as Argentina, Brazil, and Venezuela, Costa Rica, and even North America.

References

Further reading

Water buffalo breeds